Pradip Krishen (born 1949) is an Indian filmmaker, naturalist and environmentalist. He has directed three films, Massey Sahib in 1985, In Which Annie Gives It Those Ones in 1989 and Electric Moon for Channel 4, UK in 1991. His films have won significant Indian and international awards, and In Which Annie Gives It Those Ones acquired cult status in the years after it was made. He is married to Arundhati Roy who also acted in his films but they currently live separately from each other.
He subsequently gave up filmmaking, and since 1995, has worked as a naturalist and environmentalist.

Education
Pradip Krishen is born in New Delhi in 1949 and educated at Mayo College and St. Stephen's College, then at Balliol College, Oxford. He taught history at Ramjas College of University of Delhi, New Delhi.

Career

Film-making
Before becoming a documentary filmmaker (Krishen made popular science documentaries).
Massey Sahib: 1985 Hindi movie of Francis Massey, who is the 'English Type Babu' at the Deputy Commissioner's office, in a small, tribal district town of Central India in 1929. This film won 'Best Actor' Award for Raghuvir Yadav at the Delhi International Film Festival (1986) and the film won a FIPRESCI prize at the Venice Film Festival 1987. 
In Which Annie Gives It Those Ones: 1989 Indian English TV film, in which it captured the anguish among the students prevailing in professional institutions. It is based on the life of students of School of Planning and Architecture At the 1988 National Film Award it won the award for Best Feature Film in English as well as Best Screenplay for Arundhati Roy.
Electric Moon: A 1992 Channel 4 production, spoofed game-park tourists, erstwhile royals, social pretence, and ecology. At the 40th National Film Awards, the film won the award for Best Feature Film in English.

Krishen began work on a 21 episode television series intended for Doordarshan called Bargad / The Banyan Tree, a project Krishen was forced to abandon before completion, due to interference from the production house he was working for.

Environmental work
Starting in 1995, Krishen began studying trees and spending time in the jungles of Panchmarhi in Madhya Pradesh, with the help of a forester friend. Krishen taught himself field botany and began identifying and photographing Delhi's trees, extensively exploring the city's green habitat. In the course of his work, Krishen led numerous public "tree-walks" on Sunday mornings and became a keen ecological gardener. Krishen has created "native-plant" gardens in Delhi, west Rajasthan, and Garhwal, and is currently working on a large rewilding scheme at Rao Jodha Desert Rock Park near Mehrangarh fort in Jodhpur, Rajasthan. He was briefly associated with the Aga Khan Trust in an eco-initiative in the Sunder Nursery in New Delhi. In 2014, Krishen began work on a new gardening initiative at Abha Mahal in Nagaur Fort, Rajasthan. The following year, he took over as Project Director of the gardens of the Calico Museum in Ahmedabad, and most recently, leads a team of horticulturists and landscape architects to restore an extensive set of sand dunes in Jaipur city, Rajasthan.

Krishen's book Trees of Delhi: A Field Guide, published by Dorling Kindersley/Penguin Group in 2006, met with popular and critical acclaim, and became a best-seller in India.

Krishen's second book Jungle Trees of Central India, published by Penguin India, was released in 2014.

Works
 Trees of Delhi: A Field Guide, by Pradip Krishen. Published by Dorling Kindersley (India), 2006. .
 "Jungle trees of central india" by pradip krishen published by penguin books .

References

External links
 
 

1949 births
Living people
People from New Delhi
Indian naturalists
Indian environmental writers
Film directors from Delhi
Indian documentary filmmakers
Hindi-language film directors
Indian botanical writers
Mayo College alumni
St. Stephen's College, Delhi alumni
Alumni of Balliol College, Oxford
Academic staff of Delhi University
20th-century Indian biologists
Scientists from Delhi
20th-century Indian non-fiction writers